The 2015 California Dream season was the 23rd and final season of the franchise in World TeamTennis (WTT) and its first and only season based in California.

Led by Anabel Medina Garrigues, who was WTT Female Co-Most Valuable Player, Neal Skupski, who was WTT Male Rookie of the Year, and Jarmila Gajdošová, who led WTT in winning percentage in women's singles, the Dream had 9 wins and 5 losses and qualified for the franchise's first playoff berth since 2013. The Dream fell to the Austin Aces, 25–14, in the Western Conference Championship Match.

On January 13, 2016, WTT announced that the Dream franchise had been terminated due to noncompliance with the team's obligations to the league.

Season recap

Relocation to California
On February 23, 2015, WTT announced that a new ownership group had taken control of the Texas Wild and moved the team to Citrus Heights, California, renaming it the California Dream.

Trade for Bryan brothers and draft
At the WTT draft on March 16, 2015, it was announced that 2014 WTT Coach of the Year David Macpherson had become the new head coach of the Dream replacing Brent Haygarth. Macpherson has deep roots in the Sacramento area and wanted to return there with its new WTT team. Upon announcing his move to the Dream, Macpherson said, "I’m very excited to be coaching in the city where I started my WTT career back in 1992." Since Macpherson has long served as the coach for the Bryan brothers, it was inevitable that the twins would want to follow him just as they did when he was hired as the San Diego Aviators' head coach in 2014. Consequently, prior to the draft, the Aviators traded Bob and Mike Bryan to the Dream for financial consideration. The Bryan brothers were the only selection made by the Dream in the marquee portion of the draft. In the roster portion of the draft, the Dream left 2014 WTT Female Rookie of the Year Anabel Medina Garrigues unprotected in the first round and instead chose Jarmila Gajdošová. Medina was still available in the second round, and the Dream selected her but had to risk leaving Aisam Qureshi unprotected to do so. The Dream then left Alex Bogomolov, Jr. unprotected in the third round and selected Tennys Sandgren. In the fourth round of the draft, the Dream could not protect Darija Jurak, because it already had two female full-time players. Instead, the Dream used its final pick to select Qureshi who was still available.

Other player transactions
On July 9, 2015, the Dream announced it had signed Neal Skupski as a roster player to replace Aisam Qureshi who withdrew from WTT for undisclosed reasons. Under WTT Rule 402C, unless Qureshi demonstrates that his withdrawal was due to an injury, he is ineligible to play in WTT for the 2016 and 2017 seasons.

Opening the season
The franchise played its first match as the California Dream on the road against the San Diego Aviators on July 12, 2015. Jarmila Gajdošová lost the opening set of women's singles to Chanelle Scheepers in a tiebreaker. Tennys Sandgren earned the first set win in Dream history when he took a men's singles tiebreaker from James Blake in the second set to tie the match at 9. The Aviators won each of the final three sets to secure a 24–19 victory.

The following evening, the Dream played its inaugural match at the new Dream Stadium at Sunrise Mall against the Springfield Lasers. Sandgren won the opening set of men's singles for the Dream in a tiebreaker. Gajdošová and Anabel Medina Garrigues followed with a 5–2 set win in women's doubles to give the Dream a 10–6 lead. Medina teamed with Neal Skupski in mixed doubles for another 5–2 set win, and the Dream was on top, 15–8. After Gajdošová lost the women's singles set in a tiebreaker, the Lasers took the final set of men's doubles, 5–3, to cut the Dream's lead to 22–18 and send the match to extended play. Sandgren and Skupski won the first game of extended play to secure a 23–18 victory.

Five consecutive wins after a slow start
At the midway point of the season, the Dream found itself with 3 wins and 4 losses. Two of those losses were matches against the Austin Aces in which the Dream carried leads into the final set. However, the Dream started the second half of its season with a home victory over the Springfield Lasers. It followed this by sweeping a home-and-home series with the San Diego Aviators before heading to the East Coast. A road win over the Boston Lobsters was the Dream's fourth straight victory and put its record at 7 wins and 4 losses.

On July 26, the Dream had an opportunity to clinch a playoff berth if the Aces would defeat the Aviators and the Dream could beat the Philadelphia Freedoms. While both matches started at the same time, the Aces raced to a quick 25–8 victory and spent only an hour and 31 minutes on the court in doing so. In contrast, the second set of the Dream's match with the Freedoms was wrapping up around the time the Austin-San Diego match ended. After two sets against the Freedoms, the Dream found itself trailing, 9–7, with the knowledge that a win would mean a playoff spot. Bob and Mike Bryan turned things around with a 5–1 set win in men's doubles that put the Dream on top, 12–10, after three sets. Jarmila Gajdošová and Anabel Medina Garrigues increased the lead to 17–14, when they took a tiebreaker in the women's doubles set. Medina and Bob Bryan put the match away with a 5–2 mixed doubles set win that gave the Dream a 22–16 victory in the match and the first playoff berth for the franchise since 2013.

Playoffs
The Dream went on the road to play the Austin Aces in the Western Conference Championship Match on July 30, 2015. The originally-scheduled start time of the match of 7:00 p.m. CDT was pushed back, because weather issues caused the Dream's flight to be delayed. The first ball was finally struck at 9:43 p.m. CDT, and the Aces took charge from the start with Teymuraz Gabashvili and Alla Kudryavtseva opening the match with a 5–2 set win in mixed doubles over Neal Skupski and Anabel Medina Garrigues. Kudryavtseva and Elina Svitolina followed with a 5–3 set win in women's doubles over Medina and Jarmila Gajdošová to give the Aces a 10–5 lead. Gabashvili and Jarmere Jenkins won a tiebreaker in men's doubles over Skupski and Tennys Sandgren to increase the Aces' lead to 15–9 at halftime. Svitolina broke Jarmila Gajdošová, the top-ranked player in WTT in women's singles during the regular season, in the fourth and sixth games of the set for a 5–1 win and a 20–10 Aces lead with one set remaining. With the clock having already struck midnight, Gabashvili served an ace to end the tiebreaker in men's singles against Sandgren and give the Aces a dominant 25–14 victory and the Western Conference championship. The Aces won all five sets in securing the franchise's first conference title since 2006, when they were the Newport Beach Breakers.

Financial troubles and termination of franchise
In December 2015, Randy Peters Catering of Citrus Heights, California sued the Dream and its three owners in Sacramento County Superior Court demanding $19,249 for its unpaid bills as the team's food concessionaire. Also in December 2015, one of the Dream's minority owners, Bob Kaliski, told The Sacramento Bee that he had personally lost $175,000 investing in the team and that majority owner Jeff Launius had told him the Dream owed its vendors $192,000 at the end of the season. Kaliski said, "I don't know if the team is going to be back or not. I know I'm not going to be back. I don't know about the rest of the team." WTT said that the Dream had until the end of December to meet its financial commitments to the league in order to secure its spot for 2016.

On January 13, 2016, WTT announced that the Dream franchise had been terminated due to noncompliance with the team's obligations to the league.

Event chronology
 March 16, 2015: The Dream acquired Bob and Mike Bryan in a trade with the San Diego Aviators for financial consideration.
 March 16, 2015: The Dream protected Bob and Mike Bryan, chose Jarmila Gajdošová and Tennys Sandgren as new additions to the team and selected returning team members Anabel Medina Garrigues and Aisam Qureshi both of whom it had left unprotected at the WTT draft.
 March 16, 2015: The Dream hired David Macpherson as their head coach replacing Brent Haygarth.
 July 9, 2015: The Dream signed Neal Skupski as a roster player to replace Aisam Qureshi who withdrew from WTT for undisclosed reasons.
 July 26, 2015: With a record of 8 wins and 4 losses, the Dream clinched a playoff berth with a 22–16 win over the Philadelphia Freedoms.
 July 30, 2015: The Dream lost the Western Conference Championship Match, 25–14, to the Austin Aces.
 January 13, 2016: WTT announced that the Dream franchise had been terminated due to noncompliance with the team's obligations to the league.

Draft picks
Since the Wild had the second-worst record among nonplayoff teams in 2014, the Dream selected second in each round of the draft. Unlike previous seasons in which WTT conducted its Marquee Player Draft and its Roster Player Draft on different dates about one month apart, the league conducted a single draft at the Indian Wells Tennis Garden in Indian Wells, California on March 16, 2015. The selections made by the Dream are shown in the table below.

Match log

Regular season
{| align="center" border="1" cellpadding="2" cellspacing="1" style="border:1px solid #aaa"
|-
! colspan="2" style="background:#333399; color:#FF5800" | Legend
|-
! bgcolor="ccffcc" | Dream Win
! bgcolor="ffbbbb" | Dream Loss
|-
! colspan="2" | Home team in CAPS
|}

Playoffs
{| align="center" border="1" cellpadding="2" cellspacing="1" style="border:1px solid #aaa"
|-
! colspan="2" style="background:#333399; color:#FF5800" | Legend
|-
! bgcolor="ccffcc" | Dream Win
! bgcolor="ffbbbb" | Dream Loss
|-
! colspan="2" | Home team in CAPS
|}
Western Conference Championship Match

Team personnel
References:

Players and coaches

 David Macpherson, Coach
 Bob Bryan
 Mike Bryan
 Jarmila Gajdošová
 Anabel Medina Garrigues
 Tennys Sandgren
 Neal Skupski

Front office
 Jeff Launius, Majority Owner
 Bob Kaliski, Owner
 Michael Malone, Owner

Notes:

Statistics
Players are listed in order of their game-winning percentage provided they played in at least 40% of the Dream's games in that event, which is the WTT minimum for qualification for league leaders in individual statistical categories.

Men's singles - regular season

Women's singles - regular season

Men's doubles - regular season

Women's doubles - regular season

Mixed doubles - regular season

Team totals - regular season

Men's singles - playoffs

Women's singles - playoffs

Men's doubles - playoffs

Women's doubles - playoffs

Mixed doubles - playoffs

Team totals - playoffs

Men's singles - all matches

Women's singles - all matches

Men's doubles - all matches

Women's doubles - all matches

Mixed doubles - all matches

Team totals - all matches

Notes:

Transactions
 March 16, 2015: The Dream acquired Bob and Mike Bryan in a trade with the San Diego Aviators for financial consideration.
 March 16, 2015: The Dream protected Bob and Mike Bryan, chose Jarmila Gajdošová and Tennys Sandgren as new additions to the team and selected returning team members Anabel Medina Garrigues and Aisam Qureshi both of whom they had left unprotected at the WTT draft.
 March 16, 2015: The Dream left Alex Bogomolov, Jr. and Darija Jurak unprotected in the WTT Draft effectively making them free agents. Jurak was later signed by the San Diego Aviators.
 July 9, 2015: The Dream signed Neal Skupski as a roster player to replace Aisam Qureshi who withdrew from WTT for undisclosed reasons. Under WTT Rule 402C, unless Qureshi demonstrates that his withdrawal was due to an injury, he is ineligible to play in WTT for the 2016 and 2017 seasons.

Individual honors and achievements
The following table shows individual honors bestowed upon players of the California Dream in 2015.

Anabel Medina Garrigues led WTT in winning percentage in mixed doubles. Jarmila Gajdošová led WTT in winning percentage in women's singles. Neal Skupski was second in WTT in winning percentage in mixed doubles.

See also

References

External links
California Dream official website
World TeamTennis official website

California Dream season
California Dream 2015
California Dream 2015
California Dream 2015
California Dream